Windsor is an incorporated town in Sonoma County, California, United States.  The town is 9 miles north of Santa Rosa and 63 miles north of San Francisco. The population was 26,801 as of the 2010 census. Windsor was once home to a waterslide park known as Windsor Waterworks, or as the Doom Flume, from 1980 to 2006. Windsor also has a bowling center which sits right next to the site where the former Windsor Waterworks waterslide park sat until its 2006 closure.

History

Founding
The site now occupied by the town of Windsor was originally inhabited by the Southern Pomo. It was known as Tsoliikawai (ćol:ik:o=wi), meaning "blackbird field", a name also applied to the village, tribe or tribelet at the site. This group was probably part of the Kaitactemi tribe that ruled from the Healdsburg area down to Mark West Creek.

Windsor's first European settlers arrived in 1851. In 1855, Hiram Lewis, a Pony Express rider, became the town's first postmaster. He named the town Windsor because it reminded him of the grounds around Windsor Castle, a medieval castle from his home country of England. In 1855, a post office was established in Windsor. The following year, a business enterprise was built in eastern Windsor, which included a goods store, a shoe shop, a grocery and meat market, a saloon, a hotel, a boarding house, and two confectionery shops. The Northwestern Pacific Railroad was completed through the town in 1872, providing a faster and cheaper link to the Bay Area.

On May 21, 1905, a fire destroyed the center of Windsor. Fanned by heavy winds, the fire destroyed several businesses, including a hotel and a barber shop. The damage was at an estimated $30,000 worth of property.

The Great San Francisco Earthquake caused major damage to numerous buildings in Windsor, many of which were still in the process of repair and reconstruction from the major fire the previous year.

In 1915, the Old Redwood Highway through Windsor was paved. Up until then, all roads in the area had been dirt.

During World War II, a United States Army Air Forces training air base (currently the Charles M. Schulz – Sonoma County Airport) was built in southern Windsor, and it was common to hear fighter aircraft and bombers flying over the town.

In 1943, a camp for German prisoners of war was built west of downtown Windsor, on the site of a former migrant labor camp. The camp was a branch camp of the much larger Camp Beale POW camp. Those assigned to the camp worked (for $0.80 per day) at farms in the county, picking apples, prunes, hops, and other crops, packing apples, and doing similar work.

Incorporation and modern history 
On July 1, 1992, Windsor was incorporated as a town. Prior to that, it had been part of unincorporated Sonoma County. Windsor's economic growth and population boomed in the 1980s, when housing development rapidly grew during this decade. Prior to that, Windsor's economy was predominately based on agricultural work, mainly involving wine grapes.

In 1996, Windsor adopted its current General Plan. Since that time the Town has grown and changed. When the last General Plan was adopted, the internet was not widely used and the youngest members of today's workforce had not been born yet. New laws have passed that affect general plans and new planning strategies have been developed. These changes require a reevaluation of the existing General Plan and confirmation of the vision for Windsor. The 2040 General Plan project is currently underway and the General Plan will look ahead to the year 2040, so the update will not only bring policies and programs up to date, but also position Windsor for the next 25 years.

In January 1998, Windsor voters approved a twenty-year urban growth boundary, with 72% in favor. The boundary will be voted on again in November 2017.

Geography
According to the United States Census Bureau, the Town has a total area of 7.3 square miles (19 km2), 99.66% of it land and 0.34% of it water. Windsor is 2 miles (3.2 km) from the Russian River.

Windsor is located on U.S. Highway Route 101 in the Russian River valley. Neighboring cities include Healdsburg, Santa Rosa, and Forestville.

Demographics

2015
Highlights of the 2016 Windsor Local Economic Profile include: 
 Windsor's seasonally unadjusted unemployment rate was 4% in July 2015, lower than Sonoma County (4.6%), California (6.5%) and the nation (5.6%) for the same month. 
 Between 2000 and 2015, the median household income in Windsor grew by 23% to $77,205. Looking into 2020, this growth is expected to continue with median income rising to $86,914, an increase of about 12.6% from 2015. 
 The median home price in Windsor increased 12.7% from 2013 to $470,000 in 2014. This continued the increase in median home price since 2011. Although the median home price has been steadily increasing, it has not yet reached the 2005 prerecession peak.
 Both residential and non-residential construction has increased from July 2014 to July 2015, with the value of non-residential housing permits increasing much faster than the value of residential housing permits.
 Windsor taxable sales have been displaying a trend of increasing over the last four years with a gain of 10.4% from 2012 to 2013.

2010
The 2010 United States Census reported that Windsor had a population of 26,801.

Racial make-up 

Households
The Census reported that 99.8% of the population lived in households and 0.2% lived in non-institutionalized group quarters.

The average household size was 2.98.  There were 6,708 families (74.8% of all households); the average family size was 3.40. There were 8,970 households, out of which :

Age
The median age was 37.0 years.

Gender
For every 100 females, there were 96.6 males.

For every 100 females age 18 and over, there were 93.3 males.

Housing
There were 9,549 housing units at an average density of

Economy

Business and retail centers 
Shopping centers include Bell Village, Bonaventure Plaza, Brooks Village, Copperstone Building, Lakewood Shopping Center, Lakewood Village, Old Downtown Windsor, Shiloh Shopping Center, Starr Station, The Plaza on Lakewood, Windsor Creek Plaza, Windsor Palms Plaza, and Windsor Village.

Chamber of Commerce 
The Windsor Chamber of Commerce is an organization representing some 300 businesses. Service clubs, healthcare professionals, non-profits and faith-based organizations are all represented, as are retailers and manufacturers. Young adults are part of the Junior Chamber of Commerce and apply for the Educational Scholarship Program. Seniors, veterans, the disabled and those in need are served by the member organizations, as are the youth of the community.  Children and families benefit from continued support of toy drives, Easter egg hunts, and holiday activities.

Tourism 
In 2009, the Town joined the Sonoma County Business Improvement Area to take advantage of the marketing opportunities provided by Sonoma County Tourism. Through the Town's partnership with this regional organization, the Town benefits from a robust destination marketing effort, promotion of local events and tourist attraction programs.

Arts and culture
Since 2001, the Town of Windsor and local sponsors put on a weekly Summer Nights on the Green free concert series full of healthy fun, quality family entertainment and great food, collectively with the Windsor Farmer's Market.

Windsor is home to several other community events in coordination with local non-profits and standing citizen advisory groups.

Special events
Events include the annual Earth Day and Wellness Festival, Windsor Days Parade, Cinco de Mayo Festival, and the Community Art and Flower Show, live entertainment, recreation class demonstrations, event information booths, and food vendors and spring produce sales from the Windsor Farmer's Market.

Other events included the Windsor Half Marathon and Expo, the annual Sonoma County Hot Air Balloon Classic, and Ironman Vineman triathlon, the oldest iron-distance event in the continental United States (dating back to 1990).

During summer at the Windsor Town Green there are free outdoor concerts known as the "Summer Nights on the Green".  There is also a Kids Movie Series.

On Independence Day, Windsor celebrates every July 3. The event features live entertainment, local food vendors, food trucks and a kid's zone.

Windsor Hometown Heroes Military Banner Program was created to recognize and honor Windsor residents and their immediate family members who are serving our country in the United States Armed Forces. Every November, friends and family join together with the public to honor home-grown, active-duty service men and women during a Military Banner Red Carpet Ceremony.  A banner for each honoree joins the banners already hung in Windsor Civic Center since the program's inception in 2013.

Holiday Celebration and Charlie Brown Christmas Tree Grove Display. Every December, Windsor celebrates the opening of the holiday season under the glow of old lamp lights with live entertainment, children's activities, and graceful horse-drawn carriages carrying guests around beautiful Windsor Town Green. The Charlie Brown Christmas Tree Grove is an annual holiday event located on Windsor's Town Green, the premier central gathering place for Windsor residents and visitors. The event highlights 200 lighted individually decorated holiday trees lining the walkways of the Green. Businesses, individuals, students and groups showcase their talents in design and decorating with their themed trees which draw thousands of visitors to the Grove during the month of December. The event runs from Decorating Day, the Sunday after Thanksgiving, until the first Saturday after New Year's Day. It is a highlight of the annual Town of Windsor's Holiday Celebration on the Green evening event on the first Thursday in December.

Museum 
The Windsor Historical Society was founded and is dedicated to collecting, preserving, and disseminating the history of Windsor and Russian River township through museum exhibits, historic sites, educational programs and printed materials.

The Windsor Historical Society's Museum, opened in February 2009 and features exhibits on the people and events that shaped the history of Windsor. It is located in the historic Hembree House adjacent to the Town's recreational senior center facility.

Parks and recreation
Several community and neighborhood parks are settled within the Town of Windsor. Most park amenities include a variety of sports fields, play structures, restrooms and picnic areas. Local regional parks offer hundreds of acres with varied terrain and scenic views. Some trails are open to hikers only, while others are available to equestrians and cyclists as well. Trails range from uneven single-track to wide ranch roads.

The Town of Windsor offers many recreational programs year-round and seasonal. Programs include: early childhood education and interactive classes, youth sports, activities for Seniors, arts and music programs, camps and much more.

From 1990 to 1995, the Windsor Golf Club, a public golf course, hosted an event on the PGA's Hogan Tour (later called the Nike Tour and Web.com Tour, currently called the Korn Ferry tour). In April 2017 it hosted the 54-hole women's POCMED Golf Classic, part of the Symetra Tour, the qualifying tour for the Ladies Professional Golf Association.

Government

Local 
The Town of Windsor is a general law city governed by a five-member Town Council, including the mayor and vice mayor. The position of mayor became an elected one as of the November 2020 election; the vice mayor is non-elected and is chosen annually among the members of the Town Council. Council members serve four-year staggered terms, with elections occurring every two years. Beginning with the November 2020 election, council members are elected by district rather than city-wide, except for the mayor.

The Town Council hires a Town Manager to carry out policies and serve as executive officer.

, Vice Mayor Sam Salmon is acting mayor after the resignation of mayor Dominic Foppoli. The other three council members are Deborah Fudge, Esther Lemus, and Rosa Reynoza.

On April 8, 2021, the San Francisco Chronicle published an article where four women accused Mayor Dominic Foppoli of sexual assault between 2003 and 2019. Following that, five more women came forward accusing Foppoli of sexual assault, leading to public outrage and calls for him to resign.

Foppoli officially resigned on May 21, 2021, after reality TV personality Farrah Abraham publicly accused him of sexually assaulting her. This led to national attention put onto the town and the extreme pressure finally pushed Foppoli to leave office.

County 
The Town of Windsor is part of Sonoma County. The County government provides countywide services such as elections and voter registration, prosecutor and public defender, jails, vital records, property records, tax collection, public health, and social services. The Sonoma County Board of Supervisors sits as the governing board of Sonoma County and of various special jurisdictions such as the Sonoma County Water Agency, the Northern Sonoma County Air Pollution Control District, the Agricultural Preservation and Open Space District, County Sanitation Districts, and the Community Development Commission. The Board is composed of five supervisors elected from supervisorial districts for four year terms.

State 
In the California State Legislature, Windsor is located in the 2nd Senate district and the 2nd Assembly district.

According to the California Secretary of State, as of February 10, 2019, Windsor has 15,446 registered voters. Of those, 7,210 (46.7%) are registered Democrats, 3,500 (22.7%) are registered Republicans, and 3,942 (25.5%) have declined to state a political party.

Education
In 2009, the Windsor Middle School received award recognition as a California Distinguished School.

High schools 
 Windsor High School
 Windsor Oaks Academy (located on the grounds of Windsor High School)

Elementary schools 
 Brooks Elementary School
 Mattie Washburn Elementary School
 Cali Calmecac Language Academy (charter school) (K-8)
 Windsor Middle School
 Windsor Christian Academy (private school) (K-8)
 New North County Consortium (special education needs)

Higher education 
Local higher education facilities are located near Windsor and within Sonoma County.
 Empire College
 Santa Rosa Junior College
 Sonoma State University

Infrastructure

Transportation

Roads and highways 
Windsor is served by U.S. Highway Route 101, which extends through California, Oregon, and Washington.

Windsor has implemented neighborhood traffic management and calming program. The Town of Windsor is a very bicycle friendly community and won an award in 2015 from The League of American Bicyclists.

SMART service 
Sonoma–Marin Area Rail Transit (SMART) line is a voter-approved passenger rail and bicycle-pedestrian pathway project located in Marin and Sonoma counties. The initial operating segment between San Rafael and Charles M. Schulz–Sonoma County Airport opened in 2017, three miles short of Windsor. By April 2016, SMART made known it was seeking up to $38 million in state cap-and-trade funds to extend passenger service north. Service is expected to commence to Windsor station by 2022.

Nearby airport 
The Charles M. Schulz - Sonoma County Airport (STS) is located just south of Windsor. The airport offers direct flights to Seattle, Portland, San Francisco, Los Angeles, Orange County, San Diego, Las Vegas, Minneapolis, and Phoenix.

The Sonoma County Airport has been home to the “Wings Over Wine Country Air Show” since 1997. It is the biggest air show in the North Bay, and attracts over 25,000 visitors annually.

Library 
The Sonoma County Library system consists of several branches throughout the county. In 1996, when the Town of Windsor offices moved to a nearby building, the existing Town Hall building was renovated to house the Windsor Regional Library. The new full service branch library at the edge of the Town Green was dedicated on November 3, 1996.

Emergency services

Fire 
The Windsor Fire Protection District is governed by a board of directors and provides services within Town of Windsor boundaries, as well as to surrounding rural and/or unincorporated areas.

Police 
In 1992, the Town of Windsor voted to contract with the Sonoma County Sheriff's Office for the provision of law enforcement services. The Sheriff's Office received its first contract in 1993. In 2008 the Town voted to extend the Sheriff's Office law enforcement services contract for 10 more years. The Windsor Police Department is staffed by Sonoma County Sheriff Department employees through a negotiated contract between the County and the Town of Windsor.

The Town of Windsor was ranked the 34th safest city on SafeWise's list of "2016 Safest Cities of California". SafeWise has been formally conducting these reports for the past three years and the Town of Windsor has been included every year.

EMS 
The Town of Windsor has a contract with Bell's Ambulance Service to provide advanced life support (ALS) 911 emergency medical services staffed with Paramedics/EMTs 24/7/365. Bell's Ambulance has been in business since 1956 and also serves the towns of Healdsburg, Geyserville and the surrounding areas. On August 2, 2006, Pamela Bell-Simmons was presented with a proclamation acknowledging Bell's Ambulance's 50 years of service in the Windsor and Healdsburg communities. Bell's Ambulance has had a station in Windsor since 1991.

Notable people
David Ruprecht, 1990's television game host of Supermarket Sweep
Guy Fieri, American television personality
Scooby Wright – linebacker for the Arizona Wildcats and the Arizona Cardinals and New England Patriots of the NFL

Awards 
In recent years, the Town of Windsor has received awards or recognition for: 
the quality of its Old Redwood Highway Improvements Project,
being a healthy company,
the quality of its Windsor Station Area Plan,
being a bicycle-friendly community.

See also
 Northwestern Pacific Railroad

References

External links

 

 
Cities in Sonoma County, California
Cities in the San Francisco Bay Area
Incorporated cities and towns in California
Populated places established in 1992